Seeley G. Lodwick (October 19, 1920 – July 16, 2006) was an American politician who served in the Iowa Senate from the 1st district from 1963 to 1969. Between 1981 and 1983, Lodwick served in the United States Department of Agriculture during the Ronald Reagan presidential administration as Under Secretary for International Affairs and Commodity Programs.

He died on July 16, 2006, in Wever, Iowa at age 85.

References

1920 births
2006 deaths
Republican Party Iowa state senators
20th-century American politicians
United States Department of Agriculture officials
Reagan administration personnel
People from Lee County, Iowa
People from Evanston, Illinois